is a Buddhist temple located in what is now the city of Mishima, Shizuoka, Japan. It is the modern successor of one of the provincial temples established by Emperor Shōmu during the Nara period (710 – 794) for the purpose of promoting Buddhism as the national religion of Japan and standardising control of Yamato rule over the provinces. The foundation stones for the seven-story pagoda of original temple was designated as a National Historic Site in 1956.

History

Izu Kokubun-ji was founded in 741 as the provincial temple of Izu Province; however, the precise date of its construction has not been confirmed from archaeological materials or literature. As the project for such a large-scale civil engineering project was unprecedented for relatively poor and remote Izu Province, the financial burden on the local government was also very great, and the temple was not completed until around the Hōki era (770-780).  The temple was converted at some time in the Heian period to the Shingon sect, and was burned down repeatedly in the incessant battles between the forces the Takeda clan and the Odawara Hōjō clan during the Sengoku period. In the early Edo period, it converted to the Nichiren sect and was completely rebuilt; however, these buildings were all destroyed by the 1855 Ansei Edo earthquake and the site was abandoned.  

Archaeological excavations were conducted in 1956. The foundations of the South Gate, Central Gate, Kondō and Kōdō (Lecture Hall) were discovered, as wells as the foundations of the surrounding cloister, Sutra Library, Belfry and monks quarters. The layout of the buildings was in accordance with the standardized "Shichidō garan" formation, similar to Tōdai-ji in Nara, upon which the kokubunji temples were based and occupied at site approximately 145 meters from east-to-west by 181 meters from north-to-south.

Outside of the main complex, eight foundation stones of the original Nara-period Kokubun-ji’s pagoda were uncovered, immediately behind the present temple’s Hondō. The foundation stones were made of basalt, with a height of 1.5 meters. Judging from the size and layout of the foundation, the pagoda was a seven-story structure with a height of 60-meters. The center stone with a circular depression for mounting the central pillar of the pagoda was also found; however, this was removed to the garden of Prince Komatsu Akihito in Tokyo during the Meiji period and its present whereabouts is unknown. Numerous roof tiles have been recovered from the site, with the round eaves tiles having an eight-petal lotus flow motif and the kanji for "flower" and "light" stamped on the reverse. The kanji for "flower" was a symbol for an ancient kiln located in the "Hanasaka" area of Izunokuni city, and the kanji for "light" was a reference to the formal name for the kokubun-ji temples. Some of the excavated roof tiles are on display at the Mishima City Museum.

The temple is located approximately one kilometer south of modern Mishima Station on the JR East Tōkaidō Main Line railway.

See also
List of Historic Sites of Japan (Shizuoka)
provincial temple

References

External links

 Mishima City home page
 Shizuoka Prefecture official site

Historic Sites of Japan
Mishima, Shizuoka
Izu Province
8th-century establishments in Japan
8th-century Buddhist temples
Nara period
Buddhist archaeological sites in Japan
Nichiren-shū temples